Décadas da Ásia ("Decades of Asia") is a history of the Portuguese in India, Asia, and southeast Africa collected and published by João de Barros between 1552 and 1563, while living abroad. His work was continued by Diogo do Couto and João Baptista Lavanha.

Publication  
The first volume of the Décadas da Ásia ("Decades of Asia") appeared in 1552, and its reception was such that the king straightway ordered Barros to write a chronicle of King Manuel. His many occupations, however, prevented him from undertaking this book, which was finally composed by Damião de Góis. The second Decade came out in 1553 and the third in 1563, but he died before publishing the fourth Decade.

In 1602, Diogo de Couto continued the Décadas, adding nine more volumes to the collection.

The fourth volume of the Decadas was published posthumously in 1615 at Madrid by the Cosmographer and Chronicler-Royal João Baptista Lavanha, who edited and compiled Barros' scattered manuscript.

In 1778—1788,a modern edition of the whole appeared in Lisbon in 14 volumes as Da Asia de João de Barros, dos feitos que os Portuguezes fizeram no descubrimento e conquista dos mares e terras do Oriente. The edition was accompanied by a volume containing a life of Barros by the historian Manoel Severim de Faria and a copious index of all the Decades.

Content 
The Décadas da Ásia contain the early history of the Portuguese in India and Asia and reveal careful study of Eastern historians and geographers, as well as of the records of his own country. They are distinguished by clearness of exposition and orderly arrangement. They are also lively accounts, for example describing the king of Viantana's killing of the Portuguese ambassadors to Malacca with boiling water and then throwing their bodies to the dogs.

Bibliography  
 </ref>

References

 1552
 1602
 1613
 Portuguese books